The Ralph Avenue station is a local station on the IND Fulton Street Line of the New York City Subway. Located in Brooklyn at the intersection of Ralph Avenue and Fulton Street, it is served by the C train at all times except nights, when the A train serves the station.

History
This underground station opened on April 9, 1936, and replaced the BMT Fulton Street El. The Ralph Avenue El station, which was formerly above the current subway station, closed on May 31, 1940.

Station layout 

The station has four tracks and two side platforms. The two express tracks are used by the A train during daytime hours.

Both platforms are column-less and have a maroon trim-line with a deep maroon border and name tablets reading "RALPH AVE." in white sans-serif lettering on a deep maroon background and maroon border. Underneath the trim line are small directional and station signs reading "RALPH" in white lettering on a black background.

This station has a full length mezzanine above the platforms and tracks. Only the western entrance is open to the public, and there are four staircases to each platform. The mezzanine columns are painted maroon (previously dark livid) except for those that have payphones on them, which are instead painted yellow.

Exits
The fare control area at the extreme west end has a bank of four turnstiles and one exit-only turnstile. There is a token booth and two street stairs, one to the southeast corner of Ralph Avenue and Fulton Street and the other to the northeast peninsula formed by Ralph Avenue, MacDougal Street, and Fulton Street.

This station formerly had another entrance/exit to Howard Avenue and Fulton Street at the east (railroad south) end. The street stairs on the northwest side of the intersection, though closed, remain intact, but the street stairs on the southwest side of the intersection were sealed. Both platforms have one staircase to the closed-off portion of the mezzanine.

References

External links 
 
 
 Station Reporter — C Train
 The Subway Nut — Ralph Avenue Pictures
 Ralph Avenue entrance from Google Maps Street View
 Closed Howard Avenue entrance from Google Maps Street View
 Platforms from Google Maps Street View

IND Fulton Street Line stations
Bedford–Stuyvesant, Brooklyn
New York City Subway stations in Brooklyn
Railway stations in the United States opened in 1936
1936 establishments in New York City